Derk Telnekes (born April 28, 1995) is a Dutch darts player who plays in Professional Darts Corporation (PDC) events.

Career
In 2017, Telnekes won the Belgium Open. He qualified for the 2018 BDO World Darts Championship as one of the playoff qualifiers. He played Chris Landman in the preliminary round, winning 3–0. In the first round he was matched up with Geert De Vos, losing 1–3.

Telnekes won a PDC Tour Card for the first time at European Q School. He will play on the ProTour in 2020 and 2021.

On 14 March 2020, Telnekes made it to the quarter-finals of a PDC ranking event for the first time at Players Championship 7. He then reached a first semi-final the following day.

World Championship results

BDO

 2018: First round (lost to Geert De Vos 1–3)
 2019: First round (lost to Mark McGeeney 1–3)

PDC
 2021: First round (lost to Nick Kenny 2–3)

Performance timeline

External links

References

1995 births
Living people
Dutch darts players
British Darts Organisation players
Sportspeople from Deventer
Professional Darts Corporation former tour card holders